Davis Crossroads is an unincorporated community in Walker County, in the U.S. state of Georgia.

History
The community was named for the Davis family, the original owners of the town site.

References

Unincorporated communities in Walker County, Georgia
Unincorporated communities in Georgia (U.S. state)